David Marraud (born 3 August 1964) is a retired French football goalkeeper.

References

External links
 

1964 births
Living people
French footballers
FC Nantes players
Association football goalkeepers
Ligue 1 players
Ligue 2 players
INF Vichy players
Association football goalkeeping coaches
Sportspeople from Charente-Maritime
Footballers from Nouvelle-Aquitaine